Suhaib Ansari is an Indian politician and businessman. He is a member of the 18th Legislative Assembly of Uttar Pradesh, representing the Mohammadabad Assembly constituency of Uttar Pradesh. He is a member of the Samajwadi Party, a socialist political party in India. He is son of Sibghatullah Ansari. He is Nephew of Mukhtar Ansari and Afzal Ansari. He is grandson of Mukhtar Ahmad Ansari.

Posts held

See also 

 18th Uttar Pradesh Assembly
 Mohammadabad Assembly constituency
 Uttar Pradesh Legislative Assembly

References 

Living people
Indian Muslims
People from Uttar Pradesh
Indian political people
Uttar Pradesh MLAs 2022–2027
Indian politicians
Year of birth missing (living people)